Paul Fenech (born 20 December 1986) is a Maltese footballer who plays for Maltese Premier League side Balzan FC, where he plays as a midfielder.

Playing career
Fenech is a Naxxar Lions product, then moved on to play for Msida Saint-Joseph, with whom he spent two years and, in fact, it was the 'Saints' who gave Fenech the chance to make his debut in the Premier League in 2005.

Fenech spent two successful seasons with Msida Saint-Joseph, during which he was the main target of several clubs in the Maltese Premier League and, finally, it was Birkirkara which managed to sign Fenech for five years. Fenech's experience continued to increase at a national level as he was playing in the Malta national under-21 football team.

During the 2007–08 season, his first season with the 'Stripes', Fenech managed to win his first FA Trophy, thanks to a narrow 2–1 win against Ħamrun Spartans. The 2008–09 season was another successful season for Fenech, as his creativity continued to increase the power of the 'Stripes'.

During the 2009–10 season, Fenech received recognition at a national level once again when he was called by the ex-manager of Birkirkara, John Buttigieg to join the Maltese national team. Fenech won his first Premier League with the 'Stripes' at the age of 23 on 5 May, when his team was presented with the Premier League title. Fenech has played in many Champions League and Europa League qualifying matches with Birkirkara.

Fenech was then transferred from Birkikara to Balzan in 2016 after a falling out with the coach at Birkirkara. Fenech enjoyed many good seasons at Balzan with the team finishing runners up in the Maltese Premier League in the 2017 and 2018 seasons and winning the FA Trophy against Valletta in an exciting final in May 2019.

International career
Fenech made his international debut for Malta, and gained his first cap in a friendly on 18 November 2009, in the 4–1 home defeat to Bulgaria.

International goals
Scores and results list Malta's goal tally first.

References

External links
 

1986 births
Association football midfielders
Birkirkara F.C. players
Competitors at the 2005 Mediterranean Games
Living people
Maltese footballers
Malta international footballers
Msida Saint-Joseph F.C. players
Maltese Premier League players
Malta under-21 international footballers
Malta youth international footballers
People from Naxxar
Mediterranean Games competitors for Malta